Petrică Cărare (born 22 May 1963) is a Romanian wrestler. He competed at the 1988 Summer Olympics and the 1992 Summer Olympics.

References

1963 births
Living people
Romanian male sport wrestlers
Olympic wrestlers of Romania
Wrestlers at the 1988 Summer Olympics
Wrestlers at the 1992 Summer Olympics
People from Vaslui County